The Northeastern German Football Association, the NOFV, is one of five regional organisations of the German Football Association, the DFB, and covers the states of Berlin, Brandenburg, Mecklenburg-Western Pomerania, Saxony, Saxony-Anhalt and Thuringia.

Overview

The NOFV was formed on 20 November 1990 in Leipzig to take the place of the Deutscher Fußball-Verband der DDR, the DFV which was dissolved immediately before the formation of the new association at the same location. The DFV had been the football association of East Germany which itself had ceased to exist after the German reunification on 3 October 1990.

The NOFV is in turn subdivided into the Berlin Football Association, Brandenburg Football Association, Mecklenburg-Vorpommern State Football Association, Saxony Football Association, Saxony-Anhalt Football Association and the Thuringia Football Association.

In 2020, the NOFV has had 684,406 members, 4,151 member clubs and 19,902 teams playing in its league system.

References

External links
 DFB website  
 NOFV website  

Football in Berlin
Football in Brandenburg
Football in Mecklenburg-Western Pomerania
Football in Saxony
Football in Saxony-Anhalt
Football in Thuringia
Football governing bodies in Germany
1990 establishments in Germany
Sports organizations established in 1990